Herbert Paul Brooks Jr. (August 5, 1937 – August 11, 2003) was an American ice hockey player and coach. His most notable achievement came in 1980 as head coach of the gold medal-winning U.S. Olympic team at Lake Placid. At the Games, Brooks' American team upset the heavily favored Soviet team in a match that came to be known as the "Miracle on Ice."

Brooks also coached multiple National Hockey League (NHL) teams, as well as the French team at the 1998 Winter Olympics. He ultimately returned to coach the U.S. men's team to a silver medal at the 2002 Winter Olympics in Salt Lake City. Brooks died in a car accident in 2003. At the time of his death, he was the director of player personnel for the NHL's Pittsburgh Penguins. He was posthumously inducted into the Hockey Hall of Fame as a builder in 2006.

Early years

Brooks was born in Saint Paul, Minnesota, to Pauline and Herbert Brooks Sr. He attended Johnson High School, where his team won the 1955 state ice hockey championship.

Brooks continued his ice hockey career with the University of Minnesota Gophers from 1955 to 1959. He was a member of the 1960 Olympic team, only to become the last cut the week before the Games started. Three weeks later, Brooks sat at home with his father and watched the team he almost made win gold in Squaw Valley. Afterwards, Brooks went up to the coach, Jack Riley, and said, "Well, you must have made the right decision—you won". This humbling moment served as further motivation for Brooks, an already self-driven person.

From 1960 to 1970, Brooks set a record by playing for the U.S. national team eight times, including the 1964 and 1968 Olympic teams. While playing for the Rochester Mustangs in the United States Hockey League in the 1961–62 season, he formed part of the highest-scoring forward line in USHL history at the time, along with Bill Reichart and Ken Johannson.

Careers

Coaching career
After retiring as a player, Brooks became a coach, notably leading his alma mater, the Minnesota Golden Gophers, to three NCAA championship titles in 1974, 1976, and 1979. Brooks finished his collegiate coaching with a record of 175 wins, 101 losses, and 20 ties.

Soon after Minnesota won its third college championship, he was hired to coach the 1980 Olympic team. Hand-picking his team, he named several of his Minnesota players to the team, as well as several from their rivals, Boston University and the University of Wisconsin-Madison. To compete with the Soviet Union team specifically, Brooks developed a hybrid of the rugged, physical North American style and the faster European style, which emphasized creativity and teamwork. He also stressed peak conditioning, believing that one of the reasons the Soviet team had dominated international competition was that many of their opponents were exhausted by the third period.

After his team's Olympic gold medal win, Brooks moved to Switzerland to coach HC Davos in the National League A. However he resigned from this position in January 1981, only six months after being hired, with the team having a poor record and Brooks facing criticism for what were described as "rough practices". From 1981 to 1985, he coached in the National Hockey League for the New York Rangers, where he became the first American-born coach in Rangers' team history to win 100 games. After a brief stop at then-NCAA Division III St. Cloud State University, he returned to the NHL to coach the Minnesota North Stars (from 1987 to 1988), New Jersey Devils (1992–93), and Pittsburgh Penguins (1999–2000). He was a long-time scout for the Penguins from the mid-1990s, and held the role of Director of Player Personnel from 2002 to the day of his death. His hiring by the North Stars in 1987 was the last time a college coach was selected to coach an NHL team until North Dakota coach Dave Hakstol was tapped to coach the Philadelphia Flyers in May 2015.

Brooks also coached two more Olympic hockey teams: Team France at the 1998 Winter Olympics in Nagano, and the U.S. hockey team again at the 2002 Winter Olympics in Salt Lake City. The 2002 team defeated the Russians in the semi-finals en route to a silver, losing in the gold medal game to Canada. The U.S. win over Russia came exactly 22 years to the day after the famous 'Miracle on Ice' game.

Brooks was inducted into the United States Hockey Hall of Fame in 1990, and the International Hockey Hall of Fame in 1999. He was honored posthumously with the Wayne Gretzky International Award in 2004, and inducted into the Hockey Hall of Fame.

On January 13, 2000, Brooks confronted Colorado Avalanche announcer John Kelly for suggesting that Matthew Barnaby faked an injury after being hit by Alexei Gusarov with 27 seconds left. He was suspended two games for that confrontation on January 18, having been suspended indefinitely since January 15. The night before Brooks got suspended, Gusarov was suspended two games for the hit.

Broadcasting career
After he was fired by the Minnesota North Stars, Brooks then spent two years doing TV color commentary for SportsChannel America along with play-by-play announcer Jiggs McDonald.

Personal life
Brooks married Patricia Lane, known as Patti, in 1965. They had two children, Dan and Kelly.

Death and legacy

On the afternoon of August 11, 2003, six days after his 66th birthday, Brooks died in a single-car accident on Interstate 35 near Forest Lake, Minnesota. It is believed that he fell asleep behind the wheel before the accident, and neither drugs nor alcohol were responsible. Brooks was not wearing his seat belt at the time of the crash, and according to the Minnesota State Patrol, it is likely he would have survived the crash if he had been.

George Nagobads was the team physician when Brooks coached the US men's national team and Minnesota Golden Gophers men's ice hockey, and described Brooks by saying, "I really appreciated the way Herbie always treated the players, and for me, he was just like my son".

In 2004, Disney released a film about the 1980 Olympic team called Miracle featuring Kurt Russell playing the part of Brooks. (Karl Malden had previously played Brooks in a 1981 television film called Miracle on Ice.) Brooks served as a consultant for the Disney film during principal photography, which was completed shortly before his death. At the end of the movie there is a dedication to Brooks. It states, "He never saw it. He lived it."

On the 25th anniversary of the Miracle on Ice, the Olympic ice arena in Lake Placid, New York, where the United States won the gold medal, was renamed Herb Brooks Arena. A statue of Brooks depicting his reaction to the victory in the 'Miracle' game was erected at the entrance to the RiverCentre in Saint Paul, Minnesota, in 2003.

The Herb Brooks Award is awarded at the conclusion of the Minnesota State High School League's state hockey tournament to "the most qualified hockey player in the state tournament who strongly represents the values, characteristics, and traits that defined Herb Brooks."

The Herb Brooks Training Center is located at Blaine, Minnesota.

The National Hockey Center at St. Cloud State University in Minnesota was renamed for Brooks in April 2013.
 
In 2006, Brooks was posthumously inducted into the Hockey Hall of Fame in the Builders' category.  The inscription reads: "A man of passion and dedication, Herb Brooks inspired a generation of Americans to pursue any and all dreams."

Brooksisms
Brooks's original expressions were known by his players as "Brooksisms", some of which were included in Miracle. According to Olympians John Harrington, Dave Silk, and Mike Eruzione, these are a few.
"You're playing worse and worse every day and right now you're playing like it's next month."
"You can't be common, the common man goes nowhere. You have to be uncommon."
"Boys, I'm asking you to go to the well again."
"You look like you have a five pound fart on your head."
"You guys are getting bent over and they're not using Vaseline."
"You look like a monkey tryin' to hump a football!"
"You're looking for players whose name on the front of the sweater is more important than the one on the back. I look for these players to play hard, to play smart and to represent their country."
"Great moments are born from great opportunity."
"You know, Willy Wonka said it best: we are the music makers and we are the dreamers of dreams."
"This team isn't talented enough to win on talent alone."
"If you lose this game you'll take it to your grave ... your fucking grave."
"You were born to be a player. You were meant to be here. This moment is yours."
"Write your own book instead of reading someone else's book about success."
"Boys, in the front of the net it's a bloody nose alley."
"Don't dump the puck in. That went out with short pants."
"Throw the puck back and weave, weave, weave. But don't just weave for the sake of weaving."
"Let's be idealistic but let's also be practical."
"You guys don't want to work during the game?"
"The legs feed the wolf."
"We walked up to the tiger, looked him straight in his eye and spat in it."
"Tonight."
"Again."

Head coaching record

College

†Minnesota played jointly in the Big Ten and WCHA from 1959 to 1981

NHL
Note: G = Games, W = Wins, L = Losses, T = Ties, Pts = Points

Other leagues
Note: GC = Games coached, W = Wins, L = Losses, T = Ties, OL = Overtime loss, Pts = Points, Pct = Winning percentage

See also

 List of members of the United States Hockey Hall of Fame
Inspirational/motivational instructors/mentors portrayed in films
Miracle on Ice
Miracle

References

External links
 
 The Herb Brooks Foundation
 

1937 births
1980 US Olympic ice hockey team
2003 deaths
American ice hockey coaches
Hockey Hall of Fame inductees
Ice hockey coaches from Minnesota
Ice hockey players at the 1964 Winter Olympics
Ice hockey players at the 1968 Winter Olympics
Ice hockey people from Saint Paul, Minnesota
IIHF Hall of Fame inductees
Lester Patrick Trophy recipients
Minnesota Golden Gophers men's ice hockey coaches
Minnesota Golden Gophers men's ice hockey players
Minnesota North Stars coaches
National Hockey League broadcasters
New Jersey Devils coaches
New York Rangers coaches
Pittsburgh Penguins coaches
Pittsburgh Penguins executives
Pittsburgh Penguins scouts
Road incident deaths in Minnesota
Rochester Mustangs players
Sportspeople from Saint Paul, Minnesota
St. Cloud State Huskies men's ice hockey coaches
United States men's national ice hockey team coaches
United States Hockey Hall of Fame inductees